Göbl or Goebl is a German surname. Notable people with the surname include:

Hanns Goebl (1901–1986), German sculptor
Margret Göbl (1938–2013), German pair skater
Otto Göbl (born 1936), German bobsledder

See als0
Goble (disambiguation)

German-language surnames